Deer Creek may refer to some places in the United States:

Populated places 
 Deer Creek, Arizona, in Gila County
 Deer Creek, Illinois
 Deer Creek, Carroll County, Indiana
 Deer Creek, Lake County, Indiana
 Deer Creek, Minnesota
 Deer Creek, Oklahoma
 Deer Creek, West Virginia, in Pocahontas County
 Deer Creek, Taylor County, Wisconsin
 Deer Creek, Outagamie County, Wisconsin

Schools 
 Deer Creek Middle School, a public school in Littleton, Colorado
 Deer Creek Public Schools, a public school district in Edmond, Oklahoma
 Deer Creek Middle School in the above school district
 Deer Creek School (Mississippi), a private school in Arcola, Mississippi
 Deer Creek Elementary School, a public school in Crowley, Texas

Water bodies 
 Deer Creek (Arizona), a tributary of the Colorado River
 Deer Creek (Nevada County, California), a stream that runs through Nevada City, California
 Deer Creek (Santa Clara County, California), a tributary of Matadero Creek
 Deer Creek (Tehama County, California), a tributary of the Sacramento River
 Deer Creek (Tulare County, California)
 Deer Creek (Indiana), a stream in Indiana
 Deer Creek (Des Moines River tributary), a river in Iowa
 Deer Creek (Neosho River tributary), a stream in Kansas
 Deer Creek (Maryland), a tributary of the Susquehanna River
 Deer Creek (South Branch Galien River tributary), a stream in Michigan
 Deer Creek (Mississippi), a tributary of the Yazoo River
 Deer Creek (Butler Creek tributary), a stream in Arkansas and Missouri
 Deer Creek (North Fork Salt River tributary), a stream in Missouri
 Deer Creek (Osage River tributary), a stream in Missouri
 Deer Creek (Pomme de Terre River tributary), a stream in Missouri
 Deer Creek (River des Peres tributary), a stream in Missouri
 Deer Creek (Shoal Creek tributary), a stream in Missouri
 Deer Creek (South Grand River tributary), a stream in Missouri
 Deer Creek (Blanchard River tributary), a stream in Ohio
 Deer Creek (Oklahoma), a stream in Oklahoma
 Deer Creek (Oregon), a stream in Yamhill County, Oregon
 Deer Creek (Allegheny River tributary), Pennsylvania
 Deer Creek (South Carolina), a creek referred to in American Civil War accounts as flowing into Charleston, South Carolina
 Deer Creek Dam and Reservoir, Utah
 Deer Creek (Big Creek, Ontario), Canada
Deer Creek (Texas), a creek that runs through Crowley, Texas

Other 
 Deer Creek Tunnel, Cincinnati, Ohio
 Deer Creek Marsh Wildlife Management Area, in Oswego County, New York
 Ruoff Home Mortgage Music Center, an outdoor music venue in Noblesville, Indiana, originally known as Deer Creek Music Center

See also 
 
 Deer Creek Township (disambiguation)
 Deer River (disambiguation)